Sechium is a genus in the tribe Sicyoeae of the gourd family, Cucurbitaceae. Its best known member is the edible and widely cultivated chayote.

Species
The accepted species in the genus are:
Sechium chinantlense Lira & F. Chiang   
Sechium compositum   (Donn. Sm.) C. Jeffrey  
Sechium edule   (Jacq.) Sw.  The chayote or christophine
Sechium hintonii   (Paul G. Wilson) C. Jeffrey  
Sechium mexicanum  Lira & M. Nee  
Sechium panamense   (Wunderlin) Lira & F.Chiang  
Sechium pittieri   (Cogn.) C.Jeffrey  
Sechium tacaco   (Pittier) C. Jeffrey  
Sechium talamancensis   (Wunderlin) C.Jeffrey  
Sechium venosum   (L.D.Gómez) Lira & F.Chiang  
Sechium villosum   (Wunderlin) C. Jeffrey

References

Cucurbitoideae
Cucurbitaceae genera